PCP may refer to:

Science

Medicine 

Phencyclidine, a hallucinogenic and dissociative recreational drug, also known as angel dust
3-HO-PCP, a designer drug related to phencyclidine
3-MeO-PCP, a designer drug related to phencyclidine
4-MeO-PCP, a research chemical related to phencyclidine
Pneumocystis pneumonia, a form of pneumonia caused by the yeast-like fungus
Post-coital pill, a form of emergency contraception
Primary care physician, a doctor who acts as first point of consultation for patients
 Primary care paramedic, the entry-level of paramedic practice in Canada
Pharmacy Council of Pakistan

Other 

Parallel coordinates, a common way of visualizing high-dimensional geometry and analyzing multivariate data
Pentachlorophenol, an organochlorine compound used as a timber preservative herbicide, insecticide, fungicide and algaecide
Peridinin-chlorophyll-protein complex, a complex of protein and pigment molecules found in dinoflagellates
Probabilistically checkable proof, a notion in the theory of computational complexity
Put–call parity, in financial mathematics, a relationship between the price of a call option and a put option
Lysosomal Pro-X carboxypeptidase, an enzyme
Planar cell polarity, a mechanism in embryonic development
 Peptidyl carrier protein, related in structure to Acyl carrier proteins

Computing 
 Performance Co-Pilot, an open-source performance monitoring system
 Port Control Protocol, a computer networking protocol allowing hosts to create explicit port forwarding rules on default gateways
 Priority ceiling protocol, a computer science concept
 Priority Code Point, a three-bit priority field within an Ethernet frame header when using IEEE 802.1q tagged frames
 Principia Cybernetica Project, an organization and website devoted to evolutionary-cybernetic philosophy
 PCP theorem, a theorem in computational complexity theory
 Post correspondence problem, an important problem in computability theory

Politics 
 Palestine Communist Party
 Paraguayan Communist Party
 Personal Choice Party
 Portuguese Communist Party
 Pridnestrovie Communist Party
 Proletarian Catalan Party
 Puerto Rican Communist Party

Peru 
 Partido Comunista del Peru, several different left-oriented organizations in Peru
 Shining Path (Partido Comunista del Perú)
 Partido Comunista del Perú - Patria Roja (PCP-BR)
 Peruvian Communist Party

Other uses 
 PCP Torpedo, 1998 EP by American grindcore band Agoraphobic Nosebleed
 Personal care products
 Personal contract purchase, a vehicle financing product
 Person-centred planning, life-planning model
 Pre-charged pneumatic, a type of air gun
 Purple City Productions, a US rap group
 PCP - Perfect Crime Party, part of the Bakuman franchise

See also 
 "Faster/P.C.P.", a single by Manic Street Preachers, from their 1994 album The Holy Bible
 PCPA, para-chloro-phenylalanine or fenclonine (PCPA)
 pCPP, para-Chlorophenylpiperazine
 PGP (disambiguation)